DJ Jean (born Jean Engelaar, 7 May 1968) is a Dutch disc jockey.

Biography
He is most popular for his space countdown themed hard house single "The Launch". He has been an influential figure in the electronic music scene since the early 1990s. He is prolific, and releases three or more compilation compact discs per year. DJ Jean has performed all over the world, but now plays mostly in the Netherlands. During the early 90's he had a Friday night residency is at club iT in Amsterdam, before it burned down. He now hosts a radioshow at Dutch radiostation Slam!FM, every Friday and Saturday night called DJ Jean @ work.

Discography

Singles

References

External links
DJ Jean's homepage
Discogs.com

1968 births
Living people
Dutch dance musicians
Dutch house musicians
Dutch DJs
People from Veenendaal
AM PM Records artists